Here Comes the Bride may refer to:

Music
Bridal Chorus, the standard march played for the bride's entrance at some weddings
Here Comes the Bride (album), a 1999 album by Spin Doctors

Film and television
Here Comes the Bride (1919 film), an American silent comedy
Here Comes the Bride (2010 film), a Filipino comedy
Here Comes the Bride (TV series), a 2007 Filipino reality series
"Here Comes the Bride" (The Honeymooners), a 1956 TV episode
"Here Comes the Bride" (RuPaul's Drag Race), a 2010 TV episode

See also
Here Comes the Bride, My Mom!, a 2010 Japanese film
Here Come the Brides, a 1968–1970 American television series
Here Come the Brides (album), a 2004 album by Brides of Destruction